Portsmouth was a borough constituency based upon the borough of Portsmouth in Hampshire.  It returned two members of parliament (MPs) to the House of Commons of the Parliament of the United Kingdom, elected by the bloc vote system.

History 

The constituency first elected MPs in 1295. It was abolished at the 1918 general election, when the Representation of the People Act 1918 divided it into three new constituencies; Portsmouth North, Portsmouth South and Portsmouth Central.

According to Namier and Brooke in The House of Commons 1754–1790, the right of election was in the freemen of the borough who numbered about 100. The town was known as an Admiralty borough and at least one MP was usually an Admiral.

The Earl of Sandwich was First Lord of the Admiralty from 1771 to 1782. He imposed tighter Admiralty control over the borough. This change of policy led to an independent element of the local Council supporting challengers to the Admiralty candidates between 1774 and 1780.

When party politics re-emerged in the late 18th and early 19th centuries, Portsmouth was a predominantly Whig constituency. It only once elected a Tory Member of Parliament between 1790 and 1832.

The Reform Act 1832 considerably expanded the electorate of the borough. The freemen retained their ancient right franchise, but were outnumbered by the new occupier voters amongst the 1,295 electors registered in 1832. As a result of the expanded electorate the borough became more competitive. Contested elections became the norm rather than the exception, as they had been before the Reform Act.

Candidates with naval connections continued to be frequent in Portsmouth, after the Reform Act. The borough developed into a marginal constituency, particularly in the last half century of its existence.

Boundaries
The parliamentary borough of Portsmouth was (as the area remains in the 21st century) a major seaport and naval base on the south coast of England. It is situated in the county of Hampshire.

From the 1885 general election until the dissolution before the 1918 election the constituency was surrounded (on the landward side) by the Fareham seat.

Members of Parliament

1295–1640

1640–1918

Notes

Election notes
The bloc vote electoral system was used in two seat elections and first past the post for single member by-elections. Each voter had up to as many votes as there were seats to be filled. Votes had to be cast by a spoken declaration, in public, at the hustings (until the secret ballot was introduced in 1872).

Note on percentage change calculations: Where there was only one candidate of a party in successive elections, for the same number of seats, change is calculated on the party percentage vote. Where there was more than one candidate, in one or both successive elections for the same number of seats, then change is calculated on the individual percentage vote.

Note on sources: The information for the election results given below is taken from Sedgwick 1715–1754, Namier and Brooke 1754–1790, Stooks Smith 1790–1832 and from Craig thereafter. Where Stooks Smith gives additional information or differs from the other sources this is indicated in a note after the result.

Election results 1715–1800

Elections in the 1710s

 Seat vacated when Wager was appointed to an office

 Seat vacated when Wager was appointed to an office

Elections in the 1720s

Elections in the 1730s

 Death of Lewis

Elections in the 1740s
 Death of Stewart

 Seat vacated when Cavendish was appointed to an office

 Death of Cavendish

 Death of Hardy

 Death of Bladen

 Gore chose to sit for Bedford

 Election declared void on 19 December 1747 as, unknown to anyone in England on 15 December, Legge had died on 19 September 1747.

Elections in the 1750s

 Seat vacated when Rowley was appointed a Lord Commissioner of the Admiralty

Elections in the 1760s

 Seat vacated when Hawke was appointed a Lord Commissioner of the Admiralty

 Death of Fetherstonhaugh

Elections in the 1770s

 Creation of Hawke as a peer

 Death of Taylor

 Death of Suckling

Elections in the 1780s

 Death of Monckton

 Seat vacated on the grant of a pension, at the pleasure of the Crown, to Gordon

 Source for party: Stooks Smith

Elections in the 1790s

 Seymour is referred to as Hugh Seymour-Conway in the above list of members of parliament

Election results 1801–1918

Elections in the 1800s
 Death of Seymour

 The above list of members of parliament includes David Montagu Erskine as an MP in 1806, in succession to his father Thomas Erskine (who became Lord Chancellor and was elevated to the peerage as the 1st Baron Erskine in 1806). Stooks Smith does not record this election

Elections in the 1810s

 Death of Miller

Elections in the 1820s

Elections in the 1830s

 Seat vacated on the appointment of Baring as a Lord Commissioner of the Treasury

Note (1837): Stooks Smith gives a registered electorate figure of 1,517; but Craig's figure is used to calculate turnout.

 Death of Carter

Note (1838):  Daniel Quarrier (Conservative) was a candidate for this by-election, but retired before the poll.

 Seat vacated on the appointment of Baring as Chancellor of the Exchequer.

Elections in the 1840s

 Seat vacated on the appointment of Baring as First Lord of the Admiralty..

Elections in the 1850s

 Note (1852): Monck was a peer in the peerage of Ireland.
 Seat vacated on the appointment of Monck as a Lord Commissioner of the Treasury.

 Note (1857): Number of voters unknown. The turnout is estimated by dividing the number of votes by two. To the extent that electors did not use both their votes, the figure given will be an underestimate of actual turnout.

 
 

 Note (1859): Estimated turnout, see the 1857 note.

Elections in the 1860s

 

 Note (1865): Estimated turnout, see the 1857 note.
 Expansion of the electorate provided for by the Reform Act 1867

 

 Note (1868): Estimated turnout, see the 1857 note.

Elections in the 1870s

 

 

 Note (1874): Estimated turnout, see the 1857 note.
 Seat vacated on the appointment of Elphinstone as a Lord Commissioner of the Treasury

Elections in the 1880s

 

 Note (1880): Estimated turnout, see the 1857 note.
 Electorate expanded by the Representation of the People Act 1884

Elections in the 1890s

Elections in the 1900s

Elections in the 1910s

References
 Boundaries of Parliamentary Constituencies 1885–1972, compiled and edited by F.W.S. Craig (Parliamentary Reference Publications 1972)
 British Parliamentary Election Results 1832–1885, compiled and edited by F.W.S. Craig (Macmillan Press 1977)
 British Parliamentary Election Results 1885–1918, compiled and edited by F.W.S. Craig (Macmillan Press 1974)
 The House of Commons 1715–1754, by Romney Sedgwick (HMSO 1970)
 The House of Commons 1754–1790, by Sir Lewis Namier and John Brooke (HMSO 1964)
 The Parliaments of England by Henry Stooks Smith (1st edition published in three volumes 1844–50), second edition edited (in one volume) by F.W.S. Craig (Political Reference Publications 1973))
 Who's Who of British members of parliament: Volume I 1832–1885, edited by M. Stenton (The Harvester Press 1976)
 Who's Who of British members of parliament, Volume II 1886–1918, edited by M. Stenton and S. Lees (Harvester Press 1978)
 Who's Who of British members of parliament, Volume III 1919–1945, edited by M. Stenton and S. Lees (Harvester Press 1979)
Robert Beatson, A Chronological Register of Both Houses of Parliament (London: Longman, Hurst, Res & Orme, 1807) 
D Brunton & D H Pennington, Members of the Long Parliament (London: George Allen & Unwin, 1954)
Cobbett's Parliamentary history of England, from the Norman Conquest in 1066 to the year 1803 (London: Thomas Hansard, 1808)

External links
The Representation Of Portsmouth In Parliament 

Parliamentary constituencies in Hampshire (historic)
Constituencies of the Parliament of the United Kingdom established in 1295
Constituencies of the Parliament of the United Kingdom disestablished in 1918
Politics of Portsmouth